Brendan Vink (born 8 February 1990) is an Australian professional wrestler currently signed to WWE, where he performs on the NXT brand under the ring name Duke Hudson. He is also known for his time in Melbourne City Wrestling (MCW), where he was a part of The Mighty Don't Kneel.

Professional wrestling career

Early years (2008–2018) 
At the age of 18, Vink debuted as early as May 31, 2008, under the ring name Elliot Sexton. Wrestling primarily in Australia, Sexton appeared in promotions including WRESTLE RAMPAGE (WR) and Melbourne City Wrestling (MCW). During his time in both promotions, Sexton became a one-time MCW Heavyweight Champion and a one-time WrestleRock Champion. During 2018, he made his international debut in matches for the Japanese promotion New Japan Pro-Wrestling and the British promotion Progress Wrestling.

WWE (2019–present) 
On February 11, 2019, it was announced that Vink had signed a contract with WWE and that he would report to the WWE Performance Center. Vink debuted under his real name at an NXT house show on March 15, 2019, defeating Nick Comoroto. He went on to spend the remainder of March and the following month of April wrestling on house shows. Vink made his televised debut on the March 25, 2020 episode of NXT, teaming with Shane Thorne in a losing effort against Oney Lorcan and Danny Burch.

Vink made his debut for EVOLVE in 2019 as part of EVOLVE's business relationship with WWE at EVOLVE 141 where he defeated Colby Corino in his first singles match. Vink would then go on a winning streak in EVOLVE, defeating the likes of A. R. Fox, Stephen Wolf, JD Drake and Leon Ruff.

In March 2020, Vink began appearing on Raw alongside his former TMDK stablemate Shane Thorne where they faced teams such as the Street Profits and Cedric Alexander and Ricochet but were defeated. On the April 27 episode of Raw, Thorne and Vink became MVP’s newest associates as he challenged Alexander and Ricochet to a match the next week on their behalf. On the May 4 episode of Raw, Thorne and Vink defeated Alexander and Ricochet earning their first victory. However, their alliance with MVP ended after they were both traded back to NXT and Thorne and Vink would quietly disband as a team soon after.

In July 2021, Vink, under the new ring name Duke Hudson was announced to be a part of the 2021 NXT Breakout Tournament. On the July 13 episode of NXT, Hudson defeated Ikemen Jiro in the first round. On the August 17 episode of NXT, Hudson was eliminated in the semi-finals by Carmelo Hayes. Hudson would then confront Kyle O'Reilly and a brawl would ensue leading to a match being made between the two on next weeks episode of NXT. On December 5, at NXT WarGames, Hudson lost to Cameron Grimes in a Hair vs. Hair match, and therefore had to shave his hair per the match's stipulation. On the November 1, 2022 episode of NXT, Hudson turned face for the first time in his WWE career by accompanying Thea Hail and Andre Chase as Chase U's flag bearer since Bodhi Hayward was released from his WWE contract the same day.

Personal life
Vink worked as a personal trainer for Goodlife Health Clubs in Melbourne.

Championships and accomplishments
Australian Wrestling Allstars
AWA Heavyweight Championship (1 time)
AWA Championship Tournament (2016)
Melbourne City Wrestling
MCW Heavyweight Championship (1 time)
 Pro Wrestling Illustrated
 Ranked No. 479 of the top 500 singles wrestlers in the PWI 500 in 2020
WrestleRock
WrestleRock Championship (1 time)

Luchas de Apuestas record

References

External links
 
 
 

Living people
Australian male professional wrestlers
Sportspeople from Adelaide
Sportsmen from South Australia
Australian expatriate sportspeople in the United States
Expatriate professional wrestlers
1990 births
21st-century professional wrestlers